The Havre de Grace Racetrack was an American horse racing track on Post Road in Havre de Grace, Harford County, Maryland. Nicknamed "The Graw," it operated from August 24, 1912, to 1950. For a time, it was owned by the Harford Agricultural and Breeders Association and also by the notorious gambler Arnold Rothstein.

The Havre de Grace Handicap was one of the important races in the American northeast for many years. Its winners include U.S. Racing Hall of Fame inductees Roamer, Crusader, Seabiscuit, Sun Beau, Equipoise, and Challedon. Some Hall of Fame horses lost this race. In the 1919 running, Cudgel beat two Hall of Famers: Exterminator and Triple Crown champion Sir Barton.

On September 29, 1920, Man o' War won the Potomac Handicap at Havre de Grace. His son, U.S. Triple Crown winner War Admiral, won his first race here on April 25, 1936. 

The track was located halfway between the cities of Philadelphia and Washington, D.C. In the 1940s, it began losing customers to Delaware Park Racetrack and Garden State Park Racetrack in New Jersey. By 1949, its owners were forced to turn over some of their allotted racing days to Baltimore's Pimlico Race Course. In January 1951, the Havre de Grace Racetrack was sold to Alfred G. Vanderbilt II, owner of Pimlico Race Course, and Morris Schapiro of Laurel Park Racecourse. who closed the facility and transferred the track's racing allotment dates to their own tracks.

The Havre de Grace Racetrack is now the property of the Maryland National Guard, which uses the former clubhouse as offices. The grandstand, minus the canopy, has been converted into a warehouse. Nothing of the actual track remains, but an aerial view reveals a curved line of trees along the final turn.

Selected stakes races at Havre de Grace Racetrack

 Aberdeen Stakes
 Chesapeake Stakes
 Eastern Shore Stakes
 Harford Handicap
 Havre de Grace Handicap
 Potomac Handicap

Havre de Grace Racetrack in popular culture
The Havre de Grace Racetrack is among several racetracks which are used as part of the ruse in the motion picture The Sting. In the climactic scene, when Doyle Lonnegan enters the parlor to make the final bet, J. J. Singleton can be heard reporting, "At Havre de Grace, the winner Light Chatter paid 5.40, 2.80, and 2.40..."

References

 Grant, Robert The Great Trials of the Twenties: The Watershed Decade (p. 62) (1998) Da Capo Press 
Official web site for the City of Havre de Grace, Maryland
Photo of the information plaque marking the site of the Havre de Grace Racetrack erected by the Maryland Historical Trust and the Maryland State Highway Administration - at the Historical Marker Database website
Aerial view of the site of Havre de Grace Racetrack
Time magazine January 22, 1951 article on the sale of Havre de Grace Racetrack
The opening of Havre de Grace Racetrack, 1912

 
Defunct horse racing venues in the United States
Buildings and structures in Havre de Grace, Maryland
Defunct sports venues in Maryland
Horse racing venues in Maryland
1912 establishments in Maryland
1950 disestablishments in Maryland
Sports venues completed in 1912